Galion High School is a public high school located in Galion, Ohio, United States. It serves students ranging from grades 9 through 12. The school colors are blue and orange and its athletic teams are known as the Tigers. The current high school building opened in 2007 following the demolition of the previous home of Galion High School on North Union Street.

Facilities
This building is located on Portland Way North on a campus with the district's other schools. It opened in 2007 along with a new middle school to replace the aging building that was on North Union Street.

History
The first Galion Union High School was built in 1868 on West Walnut Street and served as Galion High School until 1917. This building was demolished in 1924 and a new junior high school was built on the site in 1925, which was razed in April 2008. The second home of GHS was built in 1917 on the site of a former cemetery on North Union Street. This building was extended in 1962, adding features such as a large gymnasium. This building was in use until the end of the 2006–2007 school year, with the new Galion High School opening in late 2007.

State championships

 Football – 1985 
 Boys' track and field – 1921 
 Girls' volleyball – 1999, 2000

Athletic league affiliations
North Central Ohio League: 1919–1945
Northern Ohio League: 1944–2011
North Central Conference: 2011–2014
Mid-Ohio Athletic Conference: 2014–present

Notable alumni
 J. B. Shuck, professional baseball player in Major League Baseball
 Nate Reinking, professional basketball player for the British Basketball League and the Great Britain men's national basketball team; head coach in the NBA G League

External links

Notes and references

High schools in Crawford County, Ohio
Educational institutions established in 1868
School buildings completed in 2007
Public high schools in Ohio
2007 establishments in Ohio
High School